La donna delle meraviglie (US title: Woman of Wonders) is a 1985 Italian film directed by Alberto Bevilacqua and based on a novel with the same name by him.

It entered the competition at the 1985 Venice International Film Festival.

Cast

Ben Gazzara as Alberto
Lina Sastri as Luisa
Claudia Cardinale as	Maura
Orazio Orlando as Ulisse
Flavio Bucci as Astolfo
Fabrizio Bentivoglio as Gianni

References

External links

1985 films
Italian romantic drama films
1980s Italian-language films
Films directed by Alberto Bevilacqua
Films based on Italian novels
Films scored by Carlo Rustichelli
1980s Italian films